is a Japanese voice actor, narrator, and singer who is affiliated with and a representative of INTENTION, a voice acting company he founded in March 2012. He voiced Morley in Macross 7, Hikaru Hitachiin in Ouran High School Host Club, Masato Hijirikawa in Uta no Prince-sama, Kyoichi Kanzaki in BOYS BE, Rakushun in The Twelve Kingdoms, Shiki Tohno in Tsukihime, Tsubaki Asahina in Brothers Conflict, Atsushi Murasakibara in Kuroko's Basketball, Momotaro Mikoshiba in Free!, Shinn Asuka in Mobile Suit Gundam SEED Destiny, Leo Stenbuck in Zone of the Enders: The 2nd Runner, Sōgo Okita in Gin Tama, Rogue Cheney in Fairy Tail, Lavi in D.Gray-man, Obanai Iguro in Demon Slayer: Kimetsu no Yaiba, Ryutaros in Kamen Rider Den-O and Rakushun in The 12 Kingdoms . He is part of the group  with Junichi Suwabe, Daisuke Kishio, Hiroki Takahashi, Hiroyuki Yoshino, Makoto Yasumura, and Kohsuke Toriumi. His younger brother is stunt coordinator, stuntman and actor Masaki Suzumura.

Career
Suzumura was born in Niigata Prefecture. Having grown up in a family with many job transfers, he has lived in Okayama in Okayama Prefecture and Moji-ku, Kitakyūshū in Fukuoka Prefecture, in addition to Niigata Prefecture. Later, from the age of 15 to 19, he lived in Toyonaka, Osaka Prefecture, where he entered and graduated from Senri Seiun High School after attending Daini Junior High School from the third year of junior high school. The reason why he decided to become a voice actor was because he initially wanted to be a chef and had even ordered an application form to go to a Japanese culinary school, but a friend of Suzumura's brought him a newspaper clipping that asked if he wanted to be a voice actor, so they went to an audition together and Suzumura passed.

After studying at Yoyogi Animation Academy and the Japan Narration Actor Institute, Suzumura made his debut in 1994 as Morley in the TV anime series Macross 7. Since then, he has been active in a variety of fields including animation, games, radio and music.

In 2008, he won the Best Personality award and the Synergy Award (for Kamen Rider Den-O) at the 2nd Seiyu Awards. On October 8 of the same year, he made his major label debut with Lantis.

On August 13, 2011, he reported on his official blog that he and fellow voice actress, actress and singer Maaya Sakamoto got married on August 8, 2011. In the same year, he won the second prize at the first Music Jacket Awards 2011 (for his album CHRONICLE to the future).

In 2012, Suzumura won the Best Musical Performance as part of ST☆RISH at the 6th Seiyu Awards. In April of the same year, he left Arts Vision, to which he had belonged for many years, and on May 1 of the following month, he reported that he had launched Intention Inc. with Atsushi Kuwahara, his manager from Arts Vision.

In 2016, he won the double award for Best Actor in Supporting Role and Personality Award at the 10th Seiyu Awards. In the same year, he won a special award at the sixth Music Jacket Awards 2016 (for his album Tsuki to Taiyou no Uta).

A national survey on the popularity of voice actors conducted in March 2010 revealed Suzumura and Mamoru Miyano as the most famous voice actors. In the following year, 2011, TBS Rank Ōkoku listed Suzumura as 3rd of the five most popular voice actors.

Suzumura's favorite motto is, "Life is what you make of it."

On December 27, 2021, Suzumura and Sakamoto announced that they were expecting their first child. On April 21, 2022, the couple announced the birth of their first child.

Filmography

Television animation
1994
Macross 7 – Morley
1996
Mizuiro Jidai – Shibasaki-kun
1997
Revolutionary Girl Utena – Schoolboy C
1998
His and Her Circumstances – Cousin B
Nazca – Kyoji Miura/Bilka
Bakusō Kyōdai Let's & Go!! Max – Sakyou Majima
Orphen – Sentry C
Yoshimoto Muchikko Monogatari – Kuwabaramukade
1999
Kaikan Phrase – Atsuro Kiryuu
2000
Gear Fighter Dendoh – Subaru
Boys Be... – Kyoichi Kanzaki
Pokémon – Chiko, Hisashi, Saiga
Descendants of Darkness – Yamashita
2001
X – Kamui Shirou, Researcher 2
Offside – Jean
Cosmic Baton Girl Cometto-san – Domiken-san
Captain Tsubasa: Road to 2002 – Genzō Wakabayashi
Kokoro Library – Aigame/Kameya
Super GALS! Kotobuki Ran – Yuya Asou
Dennō Bōkenki Webdiver – Pegashion, Phoenikuon
Babel II - Beyond Infinity – Koichi Kamiya/Babel II
Beyblade – Bartholome, Fuji, Steve
Parappa the Rapper – Matt
Hikaru no Go – Shinichirou Isumi
2002
Magical Shopping Arcade Abenobashi – New Bank Teller
The Twelve Kingdoms – Rakushun
Spiral – Ayumu Narumi
Gravion – Eiji Shigure
Digimon Frontier – Kouichi Kimura
Dragon Drive – Hikaru Himuro
Hungry Heart - Wild Striker – Yuuya Kiba
UFO Ultramaiden Valkyrie – Kazuto Tokino
2003
Avenger – Teo
Ashita no Nadja – Leonardo Cardinale
Astro Boy: Mighty Atom – Yuko Nishino
Please Twins! – Kousei Shimazaki
Gad Guard – Hajiki Sanada
Kaleido Star – Dio
Cromartie High School – Masao Tanaka
Tsukihime – Shiki Tohno
Saint Beast – Fūga no Maya
Divergence Eve – Co-pilot, Lieutenant Azevedo, Nodera, Operator, Researcher
Tantei Gakuen Q – innai Takuma, Policeman
Nanaka 6/17 – Kenji Nagihara
Popotan – Adult Daichi
Pokemon Advance – Kachinuki Ryouhei
Massugu ni Ikou – Ijuuin Takeshi
UFO Ultramaiden Valkyrie 2: December Nocturne – Kazuto Tokino
2004
Gakuen Alice – Reo Mouri
Mobile Suit Gundam Seed Destiny – Shinn Asuka
The Gokusen – Shin Sawada
Gravion Zwei – Eiji Shigure
The Cosmopolitan Prayers – Black Prince: 'A' Side
2005
Ichigo 100% – Junpei Manaka
Trinity Blood – Dietrich von Lohengrin
Fushigiboshi no Futagohime – Bright
Noein - to your other self – Atori
Peach Girl – Kairi Okayasu
2006
Witchblade – Hiroki Segawa
Ouran High School Host Club – Hikaru Hitachiin
Gakuen Heaven – Shunsuke Taki
Gin-iro no Olynssis – Consul
Gintama – Okita Sougo
Shonen Onmyouji – Suzaku
D.Gray-man – Lavi
Tokko – Ranmaru Shindou
Looking Up At The Half-Moon – Yuichi Ezaki
2007
Hero Tales – Taitō
Saint Beast: Kouin Jojishi Tenshi Tan – Fuge no Maya
Zombie-Loan – Chika Akatsuki
Bokurano – Hatagai
Major – Hayato Yaginuma
Wangan Midnight – Keiichiro Aizawa
2008
Naruto Shippūden – Choumei, Utakata
Amatsuki – Ginshu
Sgt. Frog – TV
Soul Eater – Kilik Lunge
Birdy the Mighty: Decode – Satyajit Shyamalan
Bus Gamer – Toki Mishiba
2009
Slap Up Party: Arad Senki – Kapenshisu
Umineko no Naku Koro ni – George Ushiromiya
The Beast Player Erin – Ial
Fresh Pretty Cure – Soular
2010
Iron Man – Sho
Maid Sama! – Tora Igarashi
Star Driver – Tsukihiko Bou/Stick Star
Battle Spirits: Brave – The Darkness Zazie
2011
A Dark Rabbit Has Seven Lives – Hasga Entolio
Uta no Prince-sama Maji LOVE 1000% (Season 1) , Masato Hijirikawa - ST★RISH
Heaven's Memo Pad – Renji Hirasaka
Tamayura - Hitotose – Sakaya
Maji de Watashi ni Koi Shinasai!! – Takuya Morooka
Dream Eater Merry – Ryōta Iijima
You're Being Summoned, Azazel – Himoi
2012
Aquarion Evol – Cayenne Suzushiro
Accel World – Ash Roller
Ixion Saga DT – Gustave
Kuroko's Basketball – Atsushi Murasakibara
Koi to Senkyo to Chocolate – Yakumo Mōri
Code:Breaker – Toki/Code:04
Sakamichi no Apollon – Muroi
Shirokuma Café – Businessman
Zetman – Hayami
Daily Lives of High School Boys – Yoshitake
Muv-Luv Alternative: Total Eclipse – Lord
Natsuiro Kiseki – Kasai-sensei
Fairy Tail – Rogue Cheney
Magi: The Labyrinth of Magic – Kōbun Ka
2013
Uta no Prince-sama Maji LOVE 2000% (Season 2) , Masato Hijirikawa - ST★RISH
Star Blazers 2199 – Daisuke Shima
Ore no Kanojo to Osananajimi ga Shuraba Sugiru – Takuya Sakagami
Gaist Crusher – Cypher
Kyousogiga – Myōe
Coppelion – Haruto Kurosawa
Senyu – Foifoi
Bakumatsu Gijinden Roman – Magoichi Suzuki
Brothers Conflict – Tsubaki Asahina
Magi: The Kingdom of Magic – Kōbun Ka
2014
Naruto: Shippuden — Sukea (Kakashi Hatake) (Ep. 469)
Wake Up, Girls! – Tasuku Hayasaka
Gundam Build Fighters Try – Wilfrid Kijima
Captain Earth – Amara
Soul Eater Not! – Kilik Lunge
I Can't Understand What My Husband Is Saying – Hajime Tsunashi
Laughing Under the Clouds – Abe no Hirari
Free! Eternal Summer – Momotarou Mikoshiba
Magical Warfare – Kazumi Ida 
Pokemon XY: Mega Evolution – Daigo Tsuwabuki/Steven Stone
 Fairy Tail (2014) – Rogue Cheney, Future Rogue Cheney
2015
Uta no Prince-sama Maji LOVE Revolutions (Season 3) – Masato Hijirikawa - ST★RISH
Seraph of the End – Crowley Eusford
Seraph of the End: Battle in Nagoya – Crowley Eusford
Gintama° – Okita Sougo
Kuroko's Basketball Season 3 – Atsushi Murasakibara
I Can't Understand What My Husband Is Saying Season 2 – Hajime Tsunashi
Rokka: Braves of the Six Flowers – Hans Humpty
Prison School – Shingo Wakamoto
Mr. Osomatsu – Iyami
Concrete Revolutio: Chōjin Gensō – Raito Shiba
Diamond No Ace – Matsuhara Nao
2016
Schwarzesmarken – Theodor Eberbach
 Ajin: Demi-Human – Sokabe (Eps.9)
 Mysterious Joker 3rd Season – Fake Joker (Ep. 32)
Uta no Prince-sama Maji LOVE Legend Star (Season 4) – Masato Hijirikawa - ST★RISH
Gakusen Toshi Asterisk 2nd Season – Jolbert Murray Johannes Heinrich van Riessfeld
First Love Monster – Jōji Takahashi
2017
Kuroko's Basketball The Movie: Last Game – Atsushi Murasakibara
Re:Creators – Yūya Mirokuji
Infini-T Force – Takeshi Yoroi / Polymar
Konbini Kareshi – Towa Honda
Gintama Porori-Hen – Okita Sougo
The Ancient Magus' Bride – Adolf Stroud
Our love has always been 10 centimeters apart – Haruki Serizawa
Blood Blockade Battlefront and Beyond – Zamedle Lolow Zeaze Nazamsandriga
2018
Gintama: Gin no Tamashi-hen – Okita Sougo
Legend of the Galactic Heroes – Yang Wenli
Nil Admirari no Tenbin: Teito Genwaku Kitan – Shizuru Migiwa
100 Sleeping Princes and the Kingdom of Dreams – Avi
Free! Dive to the Future – Momotarou Mikoshiba
Captain Tsubasa (2018) – Genzō Wakabayashi
Inazuma Eleven: Ares – Seiya Nishikage
SSSS.Gridman – Anti
2019
Bungo Stray Dogs 3 – Katai Tayama
Fire Force – Takehisa Hinawa
Demon Slayer: Kimetsu no Yaiba – Obanai Iguro
Fate/Grand Order - Absolute Demonic Front: Babylonia – Romani Archaman
2020
Infinite Dendrogram – Figaro
2021
Godzilla Singular Point – Takehiro Kai
Burning Kabaddi – Ren Takaya
Mars Red – Suwa
Backflip!! – Yōjirō Mutsu
Life Lessons with Uramichi Oniisan – Saito Uebu
Muteking the Dancing Hero – Owen
Restaurant to Another World 2 – Delivery man
2022
Trapped in a Dating Sim: The World of Otome Games Is Tough for Mobs – Julius Rapha Holfort
Uncle from Another World – Edger
Cardfight!! Vanguard will+Dress – Riku Kumatori
Blue Lock – Ryōsuke Kira
Pokémon Ultimate Journeys: The Series – Daigo Tsuwabuki/Steven Stone
2023
By the Grace of the Gods Season 2 – Pioro

Original video animation
Final Fantasy VII: Advent Children – Zack Fair
Last Order Final Fantasy VII – Zack Fair
Hi Score Girl: Extra Stage – Sagat Takadanobaba

Theatrical animation
Lu over the Wall – Teruo
DC Super Heroes vs. Eagle Talon – Superman
Godzilla: The Planet Eater – Akira Sakaki
Mr. Osomatsu: The Movie – Iyami
Free! Road to the World - the Dream – Momotaro Mikoshiba
Demon Slayer: Kimetsu no Yaiba the Movie: Mugen Train – Obanai Iguro
Fate/Grand Order: Camelot - Wandering; Agaterám – Romani Archaman
Gintama: The Very Final (2021) - Sōgo Okita
Fate/Grand Order Final Singularity - Grand Temple of Time: Solomon – Romani Archaman
Bright: Samurai Soul – Ōkubo
Mr. Osomatsu: Hipipo-Zoku to Kagayaku Kajitsu – Iyami
Backflip!! – Yōjirō Mutsu
Uta no Prince-sama: Maji Love ST☆RISH Tours – Masato Hijirikawa
Gridman Universe – Knight

Live-action film
 Ajin: Demi-Human (2017), cameo appearance

Live-action television
Tokusatsu GaGaGa (2019), narrator and Emer Jason (voice)

Video games
 Klonoa 2: Lunatea's Veil – Steward of the Ghost Palace
 Neon Genesis Evangelion: Ayanami Raising Project - Protagonist (Windows and Dreamcast versions only)
 Gigantic Drive – Naoto Tsukioka
 Final Fantasy X-2 – Gippal
 Kingdom Hearts II – Demyx
 Tales of the World: Radiant Mythology – Senel Coolidge
 Super Robot Wars Z – Shinn Asuka, Eiji Shigure
 Castlevania Judgment – Simon Belmont
 Kingdom Hearts 358/2 Days – Demyx
 Crisis Core: Final Fantasy VII – Zack Fair
 Kingdom Hearts Birth by Sleep – Zack Fair
 Umineko: When They Cry – George Ushiromiya
 Umineko: Golden Fantasia – George Ushiromiya
 Final Fantasy Type-0 – Jack
 Kingdom Hearts HD 1.5 Remix – Demyx
 Persona 4 Arena Ultimax – Sho Minazuki
 Granblue Fantasy – Sandalphon
 Final Fantasy Type-0 HD – Jack
 Fate/Grand Order – Tawara Touta, Romani Archaman/Solomon
 Onmyōji (2016) – Shiromujō
 Danganronpa V3: Killing Harmony – Korekiyo Shinguji
 Fire Emblem Heroes – Leif, Quan
 Dissidia Final Fantasy: Opera Omnia – Zack Fair
 Super Robot Wars V – Shinn Asuka, Daisuke Shima
 Tales of the Rays – Senel Coolidge, Sogo Okita
 Warriors All-Stars – Darius
 The Thousand Musketeers – 89
 Ni no Kuni II: Revenant Kingdom – President Musaka
 Snack World: The Dungeon Crawl – Gold – Avatar (Male)
 The King of Fighters All Star – Okita Sougo
 World of Final Fantasy Maxima – Zack Fair
 Kingdom Hearts III – Demyx
Namu Amida Butsu! -UTENA- (2019) – Hōshō Nyorai
 Saint Seiya Awakening- Leo Aiola
 Final Fantasy VII Remake – Zack Fair
 Tales of Crestoria – Senel Coolidge
 Fairy Tail – Rogue Cheney
 Balan Wonderworld – Balan
 Crisis Core: Final Fantasy VII Reunion – Zack Fair
 Fire Emblem Engage – Leif

Drama CDs

Aisaresugite Kodoku series 1: Aisaresugite Kodoku – Chihiro Oozawa
Aisaresugite Kodoku series 2: Itoshisugita Shifuku – Chihiro Oozawa
Aka no Shinmon – Wataru Kurumiya
Akuma no Himitsu – Priest
Amai Tsumi no Kakera – Tomoyuki Tachibana
Amatsuki – Ginshu
Ambassador wa Yoru ni Sasayaku – Ikuo Mori
Balettstar – Endō Akira
Bara no Sabaku – Kai Toujou
Bus Gamer – Mishiba Toki
Cafe Latte Rhapsody – Hajime Serizawa
Cherry Boy Sakuzen – Matsuoka Akira
Close the Last Door – Nagai Atsushi
Closet de Ubaitai – Natsuki Yamaguchi
Denkou Sekka Boys – Nanao Ogasagawa
D.N.Angel Wink Series – Keiji Saga
Gundam Seed Destiny – Shinn Asuka
Dolls – Shouta Mikoshiba
Eigoku Yoidan – Yuri Fordum
Endou-kun no Kansetsu Nikki – Kanzaki
Fruits Basket – Kakeru Manabe
Fusatsugi – Tokura Hijiri, Kidōmaru, Shiten Hōji
Gate – Minamiyama Shigeru
Genso Suikoden – Tir McDohl
Gin Tama – Sōgo Okita
Hana to Akuma – Klaus
Hanayoi Romanesque – Hōshō Sumire
Himitsu no Kateikyoushi – Takafumi Inoue
Hitorijime Theory – Tachibana
Into Your Heart through the Door – Nagai Atsushi
Iro Otoko – Suou Ishikawa
Iro Otoko: Kyodai Hen – Suo Ishikawa
Kimi to Boku – Tsukahara Kaname
Kiraini Naranai dene – Taishi Kishima
Mayonaka ni Oai Shimashou – Kon Kaidouji
Me & My Brothers – Tsuyoshi Miyashita
Milk Crown no Tameiki – Nozomi Yukishita
Mix Mix Chocolate – Mera Osaka
Munasawagi series – Hazuki Nishio
Nessa no Ou – Yoshiya
Only the Ring Finger Knows – Fujii Wataru
Ouran High School Host Club – Hikaru Hitachiin, Kaoru Hitachiin
Ourin Gakuen series 3: Sekushi Boizu de Sasayaide – Ryou Hourenge
Parfait Tic! – Daiya Shinpo
Renai à la Carte! – Shogo Izumi
Renai Trap – Tsuji Shinobu
Saint Beast – Fuga no Maya
Sakurazawa vs Hakuhou series 2: Houkengo no Nayameru Kankei– Kazuhiro Okamoto
Shiro Ari – Alice
Saredo Futeki na Yatsura – Wataru Nakahara
Sekai no Subete ga Teki Datoshitemo – Chihiro Monma
Shiawase ni Dekiru series 1, 2 & 5 – Tamotsu Kagami
Shōnen Bride – Matsūra Shinobu
Shōnen Onmyōji – Suzaku
Special A – Kei Takishima
Tenki Yohou no Koibito – Amasawa Chitose
Toriko ni Saseru Kisu wo Shiyou – Touya Sugisaki
Tokyo Junk 2 – You Yoshikawa
Tonari no Kaibutsu-kun – Haru Yoshida
Trap series 1: Renai Trap – Shinobu Tsujii
Wagamama Prisoner – Makoto Ikusawa
Wagamama Prisoner/My Master is My Classmate section – Ryou Asakura
Yasashikute Toge ga Aru – Ryou Asakura
Yuiga Dokuson na Otoko – Kyouya Ikuura
Yurigaoka Gakuen series 2: Kimidake no Prince ni Naritai – Kureha Yanase
Yuuwaku Recipe – Ueda
Zombie Loan – Akatsuki Chika

Tokusatsu
2007
Kamen Rider Den-O – Ryutaros/R Ryoutarou/Kamen Rider Den-O Gun Form/Climax Form (eps. 13 - 49), Gecko Imagin (ep. 40)
Kamen Rider Den-O: I'm Born! – Ryutaros/R Ryoutarou/Kamen Rider Den-O Gun Form, Gecko Imagin
2008
Kamen Rider Den-O & Kiva: Climax Deka – Ryutaros/R Ryoutarou/Kamen Rider Den-O Gun Form/Climax Form
Kamen Rider Kiva: King of the Castle in the Demon World – Soccer Player (Actor)
Saraba Kamen Rider Den-O: Final Countdown – Ryutaros/Kamen Rider Den-O Gun Form/Climax Form
2009
Kamen Rider Decade – Ryutaros/Kamen Rider Den-O Gun Form (ep. 14 - 15)
Cho Kamen Rider Den-O & Decade Neo Generations: The Onigashima Warship – Ryutaros/Kamen Rider Den-O Gun Form/Cho Climax Form/R Lamon/Kamen Rider Ouja (Ryutaros)
Kamen Rider Decade: All Riders vs. Dai-Shocker – Kamen Rider X, Garagaranda
2010
Kamen Rider × Kamen Rider × Kamen Rider The Movie: Cho-Den-O Trilogy – Ryutaros/Kamen Rider Den-O Gun Form/Climax Form
2011
OOO, Den-O, All Riders: Let's Go Kamen Riders – Ryutaros, Garagaranda
2012
Kamen Rider × Super Sentai: Super Hero Taisen – Ryutaros/Kamen Rider Den-O Gun Form, Kamen Rider W 
Tokumei Sentai Go-Busters – Filmloid (ep. 20)
2014
Space Sheriff Shaider Next Generation – Fushigi Beast Pitapita
Heisei Rider vs. Shōwa Rider: Kamen Rider Taisen feat. Super Sentai – Kamen Rider Fourze, Kamen Rider Black RX, Yamaarashi-Roid
2018
Kamen Rider Heisei Generations Forever - Ryutaros 
2019
Kamen Rider Zi-O - Ryutaros/Kamen Rider Den-O Climax Form (ep. 39-40)
2020
Mashin Sentai Kiramager - Mashin Fire

Commercials
The Way of the Househusband (2018) – Masa

Dubbing

Live-action
Genius – Maurice Solovine (Alexander Vlahos)
If I Stay – Adam Wilde (Jamie Blackley)
Litvinenko – Alexander Litvinenko (David Tennant)
Purple Noon (2016 Star Channel edition) – Philippe Greenleaf (Maurice Ronet)
Staged – Tom (Ben Schwartz)
The Third Man (New Era Movies edition) – Harry Lime (Orson Welles)

Animation
 DC League of Super-Pets (Keith)
 Incredibles 2 (Tony Rydinger)
 Spirit: Stallion of the Cimarron (Little Creek)

Other roles

Anubis: Zone of the Enders – Leo Stenbuck
Arc the Lad: Twilight of the Spirits – Darc
Wild Arms: Alter Code F  – Rudy Roughnight (Japanese version only)
Tales of Legendia – Senel Coolidge
Macross Zero – Shin Kudo
R-Type Tactics II: Operation Bitter Chocolate – Claude Rhan
Gakuen Heaven (Yaoi Scramble PC Game) – Taki Shunsuke
Tokimeki Memorial Girl's Side: 2nd Kiss – Hariya Kounoshin
Silver Chaos (Yaoi RPG PC Game) – Might
Thomas and Friends – Mighty
Sora no Iro, Mizu no Iro (H-Anime series) – Saisho Hajime
Super Robot Wars Scramble Commander the 2nd and Another Century's Episode: R – Shinn Asuka, Shin Kudo
Kara no Kyoukai series – Kokutou Mikiya
nopenope-Man: Shattered Dimensions (Ultimate nopenope-Man)
 and other male charactersSHORT PEACE: Ranko Tsukigime's Longest Day – Ren Kurenai
Starry☆Sky~in Winter~ – Amaha Tsubasa
Wand of Fortune PS2/PSP – Alvaro Garay
Nora to Toki no Kōbō: Kiri no Mori no Majo – Ruttz Alenius
Finding Nemo – Baily
Finding Dory – Baily
Elsword – Elsword
Bloody Call – Wataru
Growlanser VI: Precarious World (PlayStation 2) – Zeonsilt
The Legend of Nayuta: Boundless Trails – Signa Alhazan
Naruto Shippuden: Ultimate Ninja Storm 3 (PlayStation 3) – Utakata
Brothers Conflict: Passion Pink – Tsubaki Asahina
Uta no Prince-sama, Masato Hijirikawa
Uta no Prince-sama Repeat, Masato Hijirikawa
Uta no Prince-sama Amazing Aria, Masato Hijirikawa
Uta no Prince-sama Sweet Serenade, Masato Hijirikawa
Uta no Prince-sama Debut, Masato Hijirikawa
Uta no Prince-sama Music, Masato Hijirikawa
Uta no Prince-sama Music 2, Masato Hijirikawa
Uta no Prince-sama All Star, Masato Hijirikawa
Uta no Prince-sama All Star After Secret, Masato Hijirikawa
XBlaze Code: Embryo – Ripper
Heisei Riders vs. Shōwa Riders: Kamen Rider Taisen feat. Super Sentai – Kamen Rider Black RX, Kamen Rider Fourze, Yamaarashi-Roid

Music
In addition to performing many different character songs in his voice acting career, Suzumura has become a singer signed on the Lantis label. As a solo artist he writes all his songs. In his debut year 2008, Suzumura also became one of the main hosts of the annual live music event Original Entertainment Paradise (OrePara), together with the other Lantis-artists Showtaro Morikubo, Daisuke Ono, and Mitsuo Iwata.

In January, 2010, he gave his first solo concert tour in Osaka (January 10), Nagoya (January 11), Yokohama (January 23) and Tokyo (January 30). His second live tour, in 2011, was held in the same stops, Osaka (April 9), Nagoya (April 10), Tokyo (April 17) and Yokohama (May 1). Part of the proceeds resulting from this concert was donated to help the victims of the Tōhoku earthquake and tsunami. Because of the power shortage the concert was arranged simple to save power and Suzumura performed all songs in acoustic versions.

In 2012, a poll on singing ability placed Suzumura as the third best voice actor singer, behind Kishō Taniyama (1st) and Mamoru Miyano (2nd).

Singles

Albums

Connect
Since 2009, Suzumura is part of the first Kiramune unit, CONNECT, with Mitsuo Iwata. They occasionally released singles and albums and participated the annual concert Kiramune Music Festival until 2014.

Other non-anime related releases

References

External links
  
  
 

1974 births
Living people
Japanese male pop singers
Japanese male video game actors
Japanese male voice actors
Male voice actors from Niigata Prefecture
Male voice actors from Osaka Prefecture
Musicians from Niigata Prefecture
Musicians from Osaka Prefecture
20th-century Japanese male actors
21st-century Japanese male actors
21st-century Japanese singers
21st-century Japanese male singers